Jangipur Assembly constituency is an assembly constituency in Murshidabad district in the Indian state of West Bengal.

Overview
As per orders of the Delimitation Commission, No. 58 Jangipur Assembly constituency covers Jangipur municipality, Raghunathganj I community development block  and Ahiran and Bansabati gram panchayats of Suti I community development block.

Jangipur Assembly constituency is part of No. 9 Jangipur (Lok Sabha constituency).

Members of Legislative Assembly

Election results

2021
Jakir Hossain held the seat while Sujit Das of the BJP took second spot from the Left Front-Congress Alliance which only scored 4.57% of the vote.

2016
In the 2016 election, Jakir Hossain of Trinamool Congress defeated his nearest rival Somnath Singha Ray of CPI(M).

2011
In the 2011 election, Mohammad Sohrab of Congress defeated his nearest rival Purnima Bhattacharya of CPI(M).

 

.# CPI(M) did not contest this seat in 2006. Change noted is based on RSP's vote percentage in 2006.

1977–2006
In the 2006 and 2001 state assembly elections Abul Hasnat of RSP won the Jangipur assembly seat defeating his nearest rival Habibur Rahaman of Congress/ Independent. Contests in most years were multi-cornered but only winners and runners are being mentioned. Habibur Rahman of Congress defeated Abdul Haque of RSP in 1996. Abdul Haque of RSP defeated Habibur Rahaman of Congress in 1991. Habibur Rahaman of Congress defeated Abdul Haque of RSP in 1987, Badaruddin Ahmed, Independent, in 1982 and Achintya Singha of SUC in 1977.

1957–1972
Habibur Rahaman of Congress won in 1972. Radaruddin Ahammad, Independent, won in 1971. Abdul Haque of RSP/Independent won in 1969 and 1967. Muktipada Chatterjee of Congress won in 1962. Jangipur was joint seat in 1957. Shyamapada Bhattachacharya and Kuber Chand Halder, both of Congress, won.

References

Notes

Citations

Assembly constituencies of West Bengal
Politics of Murshidabad district